Isidoor Van De Wiele (30 July 1924 – 8 February 2010) was a Belgian sprinter. He competed in the men's 100 metres at the 1948 Summer Olympics.

Competition record

References

1924 births
2010 deaths
Athletes (track and field) at the 1948 Summer Olympics
Belgian male sprinters
Olympic athletes of Belgium
Sportspeople from Antwerp